The Committee on International Trade (INTA) is a committee of the European Parliament. Its current chair, elected on 10 July 2019, is Bernd Lange. INTA is responsible for matters relating to the establishment, implementation and monitoring of the EU’s common commercial policy and its external economic relations, including trade and investment legislation, bilateral, plurilateral and multilateral agreements and relations with the World Trade Organisation (WTO). With the Treaty of Lisbon, the Parliament has become a co-legislator in the Union’s Common Commercial Policy and has the final say on entry into force of all trade agreements. Moreover, the Union competencies were expanded to include foreign investment.

The main legislative achievements guided through the Parliament by INTA during the 7th parliamentary term (2009-2014) include regulations on 'Grandfathering', 'Financial Responsibility', macro-financial assistance to third countries, 'Enforcement’, 'Dual Use', 'Omnibus I and II' packages, the review of the Generalised System of Preferences (GSP) and the Market Access Regulation (MAR). Legislation on the Public procurement and Modernisation of the Trade Defence Instruments (TDI) would only be adopted if an agreement with the Council is reached.

During its last term the European Parliament gave consent to free trade agreements with South Korea and Peru/Colombia, rejected Anti-Counterfeiting Trade
Agreement (ACTA), scrutinised trade talks with Canada, Singapore and African, Caribbean and Pacific (ACP) countries and started examining ongoing negotiations with Japan and the US.

Chairpersons

References

External links
Official Homepage
Powers and responsibilities

International
Foreign trade of the European Union
Parliamentary committees on International Trade